Saronno railway station is a railway station in Italy. It serves the town of Saronno.

Services
Saronno is terminus of the lines S1, S3 and S9 of the Milan suburban railway network, and served as well by the regional trains from Milan to Como, Laveno and Novara, and by the Malpensa Express. All this trains are operated by the Lombard railway company Trenord.

See also
Milan suburban railway network

External links
 Ferrovienord official site - Saronno railway station 

Railway stations in Lombardy
Ferrovienord stations
Railway stations opened in 1879
Milan S Lines stations